Viktor Boone (born 25 January 1998) is a Belgian footballer who plays for Royale Union Saint-Gilloise in the Belgian First Division A as a central defender.

He is the son of former footballer Nico Boone, who played in the top flight of Belgian footballer for K.V. Kortrijk. Viktor Boone was in the youth system at K.A.A. Gent before joining Sparta Petegem in 2017. Boone then played for K.M.S.K. Deinze for 4 seasons, with the last 2 being in the Challenger Pro League. In June, 2022 he signed with Union SG on a two year contract, with the option of a third. He made his debut for Union SG on 6 August 2022 starting a 3-0 away defeat against K.V. Mechelen.

References

1998 births
Living people
Belgian footballers
K.M.S.K. Deinze players
Royale Union Saint-Gilloise players
Belgian Pro League players
Challenger Pro League players